"Only This Moment" is the first single from Norwegian duo Röyksopp's second album, The Understanding (2005). The track features Kate Havnevik on guest vocals and co-writing.

Reception
The single was released on 27 June 2005 in the United Kingdom and reached number 33 on the UK Singles Chart.

Music video
The music video for "Only This Moment" is closely based on the events of May 1968. The video contains riots, banners and elements of propaganda. It was directed by Brendan McNamee and Robert Chandler.

Track listing
 "Only This Moment" (radio edit) – 3:41
 "Only This Moment" (Röyksopp's Hissige) – 6:15
 "Only This Moment" (Headman Remix) – 7: 05
 "Only This Moment" (Chab Remix) – 8:41
 "Only This Moment" (Alan Braxe & Fred Falke Remix) – 6:34
 "Only This Moment" (Royksopp's Forsiktige Massasje) – 4:57
 "Sombre Detune" – 4:58

Charts

References

2005 singles
Röyksopp songs
2004 songs
Astralwerks singles
Songs written by Svein Berge
Songs written by Torbjørn Brundtland